Leptoscyphus azoricus is a species of liverwort in the family Lophocoleaceae. It is endemic to Portugal.

References

Jungermanniales
Flora of Portugal
Least concern plants
Taxonomy articles created by Polbot